Macarena Sans (born 20 November 1996) is an Argentine handball player for Mendoza de Regatas and the Argentina women's national handball team.

She defended Argentina at the 2015 World Women's Handball Championship in Denmark, and at the 2012 London Summer Olympics.

Individual awards and achievements
2017 Pan American Women's Club Handball Championship – Best right back

References

External links

Argentine female handball players
1996 births
Living people
Handball players at the 2016 Summer Olympics
Olympic handball players of Argentina
Pan American Games medalists in handball
Pan American Games silver medalists for Argentina
Handball players at the 2015 Pan American Games
Handball players at the 2019 Pan American Games
South American Games silver medalists for Argentina
South American Games medalists in handball
Competitors at the 2018 South American Games
Sportspeople from Mendoza, Argentina
Medalists at the 2015 Pan American Games
Medalists at the 2019 Pan American Games
21st-century Argentine women